The Hamburg Mountains are a range of the New York-New Jersey Highlands region of the Appalachian Mountains.

Geography
The Hamburg Mountains and Wawayanda Mountain on the east, and Pochuck Mountain to the west, form the borders of the Vernon Valley, an important farming and mining area of New Jersey drained by Pochuck Creek.

Geology
The Hamburg Mountains are part of the Reading Prong of the New England Upland subprovince of the New England province of the Appalachian Highlands.  The rocks that form the Hamburg Mountains are comprised from the same belt that make up other mountains nearby.  This belt, i.e. the Reading Prong, consists of ancient crystalline metamorphic rocks.  The New England province as a whole, along with the Blue Ridge province further south, are often together referred to as the Crystalline Appalachians.  The Crystalline Appalachians extend as far north as the Green Mountains of Vermont and as far south as the Blue Ridge Mountains, although a portion of the belt remains below the Earth's surface through part of Pennsylvania.  The Crystalline Appalachians are distinct from the parallel Sedimentary Appalachians which run from Georgia to New York.  The nearby Kittatinny Mountains are representative of these sedimentary formations.

History
An 1834 description read,

References

Landforms of Sussex County, New Jersey
Hills of New Jersey